Árpád Miskey (11 September 1886 – 15 October 1962) was a Hungarian wrestler. He competed in the middleweight event at the 1912 Summer Olympics.

References

External links
 

1886 births
1962 deaths
Olympic wrestlers of Hungary
Wrestlers at the 1912 Summer Olympics
Hungarian male sport wrestlers
Martial artists from Budapest